Jannik Bandowski (born 30 March 1994) is a German professional footballer who plays for Greifswalder FC.

Club career

Borussia Dortmund II
On 3 October 2013, Bandowski scored a goal in a 3. Liga match against Darmstadt 98 in the 11th minute. The match ended 1–1, after he made an own goal nine minutes later.

1860 Munich
On 31 January 2015, it was announced, that Bandowski would go on a loan to TSV 1860 Munich. He scored already in his first appearance for his new club on 15 February 2015 in a 1–1 tie against Darmstadt 98.

Career statistics

1 2014–15 includes the 3. Liga/2. Bundesliga promotion/relegation playoffs.

References

External links
 
 
 Bundesliga profile
 

1994 births
Living people
Association football fullbacks
Association football midfielders
German footballers
Germany youth international footballers
Borussia Dortmund II players
Borussia Dortmund players
TSV 1860 Munich players
TSV 1860 Munich II players
VfL Bochum players
SpVgg Unterhaching players
TSV Steinbach Haiger players
2. Bundesliga players
3. Liga players
Regionalliga players
People from Korbach
Sportspeople from Kassel (region)
Footballers from Hesse